Vincenzo Natoli was a Sicilian judge. He was made a marquess in 1756 by Charles III, the king of the Two Sicilies.

Life
Natoli was born in 1690 at Sant'Angelo di Brolo. From 1730 to 1734, and again in 1740, he was a judge of the Gran Corte Criminale ("grand criminal court") of Palermo. From 10 April 1748 he was a minister in Messina. On 10 July 1751 he became a Regio Consultore, an advisor to the king in Naples. From 1758 he was president of the tribunal of the Real Patrimonio, or "royal heritage", in Palermo. He became president of the Civil and Criminal High Court in April 1761.

Natoli married Angela Piola and then, in 1748, he married the widowed daughter of Baron Mangiadaini, Maria Sieripopoli. His son Artale Natoli pre-deceased him, dying on 11 December 1768. Natoli died in Palermo on 21 October 1770 and was buried in the Catacombe dei Cappuccini in that city.

References

1690 births
1770 deaths
People from the Province of Messina
Jurists from Sicily